Lanistes boltenianus is a species of a freshwater snail, an aquatic gastropod mollusk with a gill and an operculum in the family Ampullariidae, the apple snails.

References

External links

Ampullariidae
Gastropods described in 1798